Aquimarina agarilytica  is a Gram-negative, aerobic, and rod-shaped bacterium from the genus of Aquimarina which has been isolated from the alga Porphyra haitanensis near the Nan'ao County from the China sea near China.

References

Further reading

External links
Type strain of Aquimarina agarilytica at BacDive -  the Bacterial Diversity Metadatabase	

Flavobacteria
Bacteria described in 2012